Borealea nobilis is a species of sea slug, an aeolid nudibranch, a marine heterobranch mollusc in the family Flabellinidae.

Distribution
Borealea nobilis was described from a single specimen dredged in 145 m depth off Cape Cod in 1879. It is widely distributed in the northern Atlantic Ocean from Norway south to Ireland and on the North American coast south to New England.

Description
This species is translucent white with opaque white markings. The digestive gland in the cerata is either orange or red in colour. The rhinophores are pale yellow-brown in colour and covered with small papillae.

This species grows to 40–50 mm (4–5 cm) in length. The maximum recorded body length is 63 mm.

Ecology 
Minimum recorded depth is 20 m. Maximum recorded depth is 190 m.

References

External links

Flabellinidae
Gastropods described in 1880